Cornusiin E is a dimeric derivative of tellimagrandin II found in Tellima grandiflora.

References

External links 
 Cornusiin E at biocyc.org

Ellagitannins
Tannin dimers